Foshtanq (also Romanized as Foshtanaq; also known as Fashtān and Fashtaq) is a village in Bashtin Rural District, Bashtin District, Davarzan County, Razavi Khorasan Province, Iran. At the 2006 census, its population was 88, in 38 families.

References 

Populated places in Davarzan County